Hanna–McEuen was an American country music duo consisting of first cousins Jaime Hanna and Jonathan McEuen, both vocalists and guitarists. Their fathers, Jeff Hanna and John McEuen, co-founded the Nitty Gritty Dirt Band, a country music band which had success in the 1970s and 1980s. In addition, Hanna was formerly an occasional supporting musician for the Tex-Mex/americana band The Mavericks.

Hanna–McEuen released its self-titled debut album on DreamWorks Records in 2005, although the album's singles were distributed and promoted by MCA Nashville. The album produced a Top 40 hit on the Billboard Hot Country Songs charts in "Something Like a Broken Heart", followed by "Tell Me" at number 56 and "Ocean", which did not chart.

The duo also recorded a DVD-Audio/Video project titled "Tried and True" in 2007 for AIX Records, which featured a guest appearance by country guitarist Albert Lee.

After disbanding, Hanna joined Gary Allan's road band, in which he plays guitar. He also co-wrote Allan's 2008 single "She's So California". McEuen, meanwhile, has continued to record as a solo artist. Jaime Hanna currently is working as part of the Nitty Gritty Dirt Band, playing lead acoustic and electric guitars, providing background and some lead vocals.

Discography

Albums

Singles

Music videos

References

Country music groups from Tennessee
Country music duos
DreamWorks Records artists
Musical groups established in 2005
Musical groups disestablished in 2005
Musical groups from Nashville, Tennessee
2005 establishments in Tennessee
2005 disestablishments in Tennessee